Anakasia simplicifolia is a species of plant in the family Araliaceae, the only species of the genus Anakasia. It is endemic to Western New Guinea.

References

Araliaceae
Monotypic Apiales genera